Coptic Egypt: The Christians of the Nile is a 2000 illustrated monograph on Copts and Christian Egypt. Written by the Belgian historian of religion Christian Cannuyer, and published in pocket format by Éditions Gallimard as the  volume in their 'Découvertes' collection, in collaboration with the Institut du Monde Arabe.

Introduction 

The book is part of the  series in the 'Découvertes Gallimard' collection. According to the tradition of 'Découvertes', which is based on an abundant pictorial documentation and a way of bringing together visual documents and texts, enhanced by printing on coated paper, as commented in L'Express, 'genuine monographs, published like art books'. It's almost like a 'graphic novel', replete with colour plates.

The English-language edition entitled Coptic Egypt: The Christians of the Nile, came out in 2001. This book has only been translated into English.

Contents 
Christian Cannuyer traces in five chapters the early history, the rich artistic and spiritual heritage of the Egyptian Christians known as Copts in this densely illustrated volume, along with other topics, such as Coptic Christology, Coptic art and Christian conversions to Islam. The book starts with 'The First Church of Alexandria' (chap. I), from Roman times (chap. II, 'When Egypt was Christian'), Islamic Egypt (chap. III, 'Under the Sign of the Crescent'), Turkish conquest and the rediscovery of Coptic Christians by the West (chap. IV, 'Crossing the Desert'), up to modern era (chap. V, 'The Copts in the Modern Era'). The author also gives a brief explanation of the influence of ancient Egyptian culture and religion on the Copts.

The second part of the book, the 'Documents', containing a compilation of excerpts divided into five parts: 1, Origins of the Egyptian church; 2, The Desert Fathers; 3, The echoes of ancient Egypt; 4, On earth as it is in heaven; 5, The Copts as seen by the West. They are followed by a map of Coptic Egypt, a list of further reading, list of illustrations and an index.

Synopsis 
In ancient Egypt, religion was an omnipresent phenomenon. The Romans occupied the country at about the time when Christianity was born, an extraordinary phenomenon then took place: little by little, Christ replaced the Egyptian god Osiris, and all the more easily as the Gospels report the almost four-year stay of the Holy Family in the Nile Valley. Alexandria, the great Mediterranean city, was the home to the first Christians in Egypt. According to the tradition, the Church was born here with Saint Mark the Evangelist, which later became part of the Eastern Christian Empire. Egypt even adopted Christianity as its state religion in the 4th century. Egypt at that time—especially Alexandria—was a real crossroads where the ancient culture of the Pharaohs, the Greek and Roman cultures, Judaic and Gnostic currents have had a strong influence on the young Christian communities.

The Copts today still use in their liturgy the Coptic language, derived from the ancient Egyptian, to pray in churches and monasteries founded in the 4th century by the Desert Fathers—Anthony, Pachomius, Paul of Thebes—and gather at festivals and pilgrimages dedicated to the Lord, the Mother of God, the saints and the martyrs. Cannuyer explains the definition of the name Copt in his book:

Reception 
On Babelio, the book has an average of 4.0/5 based on 4 ratings. Goodreads reported, based on 20 ratings, the UK edition gets an average of 3.55 out of 5, and the US edition 3.35/5 based on 26 ratings, indicating 'generally positive opinions'.

In the Anglican newspaper Church Times, the review says: 'From the book, a glossy paperback crammed with facts and pictures.'

The Cairene broadsheet Al-Ahram Weekly gave the book a positive review: 'A small informative, well-researched and beautiful publication that conveys the richness and diversity of the Coptic heritage.'

So it is not only addressed to students of Egyptology but to historians of early Christianity and to those of Gnosis. His book is a model of the genre, a genre which, it must be said, already has a lot of interesting titles. Popularisation? Yes, but made by a specialist. [...] [Compared with the Coptic Encyclopedia], neophytes will undoubtedly prefer the excellent and very handy "Découvertes Gallimard".'

Religious travels 

See also 
 Coptology
 Coptic monasticism
 In the 'Découvertes Gallimard' collection:
 The Search for Ancient Egypt by Jean Vercoutter
 Mummies: A Voyage Through Eternity by Françoise Dunand
 The Pyramids of Giza: Facts, Legends and Mysteries by Jean-Pierre Corteggiani
 Champollion : Un scribe pour l'Égypte by

References

External links 
  
 
  

2000 non-fiction books
History books about Egypt
History books about Christianity
History books about ethnic groups
Coptic history
Coptology
Découvertes Gallimard